The Pride of Performance, officially known as Presidential Pride of Performance, is an award bestowed by the Islamic Republic of Pakistan to recognize people with "notable achievements in the field of art, science, literature, sports, and nursing". The Pride of Performance is the highest national literary award of Pakistan conferred upon its citizens and, while it recognizes literary contribution, it can also be conferred upon foreign nationals. It is usually awarded by the president once a year at the Pakistan resolution day, but announcements are made at independence day ceremony held on 14 August. The award recommendations are made by the country's administrative units or respective ministry to the state governments where officials send it to the Cabinet Secretariat and then president or federal government for final approval.

The president's Pride of Performance award which was possibly first awarded in 1958, can also be conferred posthumously under a constitutional amendment Article 259 of clause two. It was delayed twice in the history of Pakistan. The fourth president Zulfikar Ali Bhutto was the first ruler who did not confer or announce the award, and later in 2018, due to disqualification of Nawaz Sharif, the award was subsequently delayed.

History
The Pride of Performance award, including civil decorations was established in 1957 under the Decorations Act, 1975, enacted or modified in 1975. The award seeks to recognize notable achievements which are determined by the Pakistan Warrant of Precedence of 1980.

List of recipients
 Pride of Performance Awards (1958–1959)
 Pride of Performance Awards (1960–1969)
 Pride of Performance Awards (1970–1979)
 Pride of Performance Awards (1980–1989)
 Pride of Performance Awards (1990–1999)
 Pride of Performance Awards (2000–2009)
 Pride of Performance Awards (2010–2019)
 Pride of Performance Awards (2020–2029)

References

 
Civil awards and decorations of Pakistan
Awards established in 1958
1958 establishments in Pakistan